Greg Norman's Golf Power is a golf-simulation video game developed by Gremlin Interactive for the Nintendo Entertainment System (NES), and published by Virgin Interactive in 1992. It was the final golf title published for the NES.

Gameplay
Other than bearing the name and likeness of Australian professional golfer Greg Norman, the game is distinguished from most other golf simulations by providing a hole-design mode in which the player can create and customize an 18-hole course. The cartridge contained a battery back-up that allowed the player to save their created course. Along with the hole-design mode, there are four pre-set courses, taking place in England, Scotland, the United States, and Japan.

The game made use of the NES Four Score, which allows for four-player gameplay.

See also
List of golf video games
List of Nintendo Entertainment System games

References

1992 video games
Golf video games
Nintendo Entertainment System games
Nintendo Entertainment System-only games
North America-exclusive video games
Sports video games set in the United States
Video games developed in the United Kingdom
Video games set in Europe
Video games set in Hawaii
Video games set in Japan
Multiplayer and single-player video games
Video games scored by Barry Leitch
Cultural depictions of Australian men
Cultural depictions of golfers
Video games based on real people